Edward Stephens (born c. 1552), of Dover, Kent, was an English politician.

He was a Member of Parliament (MP) for Dover in 1589.

References

1550s births
Year of death missing
Members of the Parliament of England for Dover
English MPs 1589